German submarine U-822 was a Type VIIC U-boat of Nazi Germany's Kriegsmarine during World War II.

She was ordered on 20 January 1941, and was laid down on 29 October 1941 at Oderwerke AG, Stettin, as yard number 822. She was launched on 20 February 1944 and commissioned under the command of Oberleutnant zur See Josef Elsinghorst on 1 July 1944.

Design
German Type VIIC submarines were preceded by the shorter Type VIIB submarines. U-822 had a displacement of  when at the surface and  while submerged. She had two shafts and two  propellers.

U-822 was fitted with five  torpedo tubes (four fitted at the bow and one at the stern), fourteen torpedoes or 26 TMA mines, one  SK C/35 naval gun, (220 rounds), one  Flak M42 and two twin  C/30 anti-aircraft guns. The boat had a complement of between 44 — 52 men.

Service history
U-822 did not participate in any war patrols.

U-822 was scuttled in Wesermünde on 5 May 1945, as part of Operation Regenbogen. Her wreck was raised and broken up in 1948.

References

Bibliography

External links

German Type VIIC submarines
U-boats commissioned in 1944
World War II submarines of Germany
Ships built in Stettin
1944 ships
Operation Regenbogen (U-boat)
Maritime incidents in May 1945